Artur Sardionovich Pagayev (born 28 December 1971) is an association football coach and a former player who played the bulk of his career for FC Alania Vladikavkaz. He is an assistant coach with FC Alania Vladikavkaz.

Honours
 Russian Premier League winner: 1995.
 Russian Premier League runner-up: 1992, 1996.

International career
Pagayev made his debut for Russia on 27 May 1998 in a friendly against Poland.

External links 
  Profile

1971 births
People from North Ossetia–Alania
Living people
Russian footballers
Russia international footballers
Russian Premier League players
FC Spartak Vladikavkaz players
Ossetian people
Russian football managers
FC Spartak Vladikavkaz managers
Association football defenders
Sportspeople from North Ossetia–Alania